Calm Before the Storm is the first album by British singer Lauren Harris. The album was released in the US on 10 June 2008, as a digital download on 16 June, and in Europe on 23 June.

Having a melodic hard rock sound, the release features several guest stars such as musicians Mick Quinn (also of Supergrass) Richie Faulkner (also of Voodoo Six and Judas Priest), and her father Steve Harris (of Iron Maiden).

Track listing

"Steal Your Fire" – 4:31
"Your Turn" – 3:41
"Get Over It" – 3:49
"Like It or Not" – 3:28
"From the Bottom to the Top" – 3:41
"Let Us Be" – 3:53
"Hurry Up" – 4:18
"Come on Over" – 4:09
"Hit or Miss" – 3:54
"See Through" – 3:43
"You Say" – 4:30
"Natural Thing" (Bonus Track) – 3:23

Also Included – Lauren Harris Video Showreel:
Featuring Steal Your Fire, Let Us Be and Your Turn Live and Promo Footage

Personnel
Produced by Tommy McWilliams for Monstro Visionary Entertainment
Lauren Harris – lead & backing vocals
Richie Faulkner – guitars
Tommy McWilliams – drums, keyboards, guitar (tracks 7, 11), programming, backing vocals
Steve Harris – bass (tracks 1, 5, 8, 12), backing vocals (tracks 1, 5, 8)
John Falcone – bass (tracks 4, 6)
Miguel Gonzales – bass (tracks 2, 3, 9, 10, 11)
Michael Quinn – bass (track 7), backing vocals (tracks 2, 3, 7)
Joe Lazarus – drums (tracks 8, 12)

References

External links
Lauren Harris official website

Lauren Harris albums
2008 debut albums